Shauna Rolston is a Canadian cellist.

Rolston was a cello child prodigy and attended the Geneva Conservatory in Switzerland at age fourteen.  She studied with Pierre Fournier, and later at the Britten-Pears School in Aldeburgh (England) where she also studied with William Pleeth. At sixteen, she played at New York's Town Hall, with her mother at the piano. Following her formative studies at the Banff Centre and abroad, Rolston earned undergraduate (Art) and graduate (Music) degrees at Yale where she studied with Aldo Parisot.

Rolston is an advocate for new music, and has premiered a number of works written for her. Composers who have written for her include  Kelly-Marie Murphy, Heather Schmidt, Oskar Morawetz, Bruce Mather, Christos Hatzis and Chan Ka Nin, as well as Krzysztof Penderecki, Gavin Bryers, Mark Anthony Turnage, Rolf Wallin, Augusta Read Thomas, Karen Tanaka, and Gary Kulesha.

Rolston continues to perform regularly around the world appearing in recital and concerto engagements. As a chamber musician, Rolston has performed and recorded with many pre-eminent artists and ensembles including the Gallois Quintet, and pianist Menahem Pressler.

In 1994 Shauna Rolston joined the music faculty of the University of Toronto where she is a Professor and Head of the String Department. She is also a regular Visiting Artist for the Music and Sound Programs at the Banff Centre.

Discography 
The Romantic Cello, 1983
Morawetz, Bruch, Fauré, Dvořák, Bliss, 1991
Saint-Saëns: Chamber Works, 1994
Cello Sonatas, 1995
Elgar and Saint-Saëns: Cello Concertos, 1995
Intimate Baroque, 1995
Strauss, Debussy and Barber Sonatas, 1995
Squeezplay, 1997
Les Disques SRC Collection, 1999
Shauna Rolston, Cello, 2001
This Is the Colour of My Dreams, 2001
Dreamscape, 2007

References

External links 
 http://www.shaunarolston.com/
 https://web.archive.org/web/20080602225156/http://www.mgmg.ca/artists-rolston.php
 https://web.archive.org/web/20090301072532/http://www.music.utoronto.ca/faculty/faculty_members/faculty_n_to_z/shauna_rolston.htm

Living people
Canadian classical cellists
Canadian women classical cellists
Year of birth missing (living people)